Kasym Tynystanov (10 September 1901 – 6 November 1938) was a prominent Kyrgyz linguist, politician and poet.

Biography
Kasym Tynystanov was born in 1901 in the village of Chyrpykty, Semirechye Oblast (now in the Issyk-Kul Region of Kyrgyzstan). According to his autobiography he learned to read and write the Arabic alphabet from his father. He went to school between 1912 and 1916 in Karakol and Sazonovka village (current name: Anan'yevo).

Literacy was minimal among Kyrgyz nomads at the beginning of the 20th century—the literacy rate was 2.5% in 1924. In 1916 after an unsuccessful revolt against Tsarist authorities, most of the residents of Issyk-Kul, fleeing Russian troops, escaped to the Republic of China, Kasym and his parents were among them. They returned in December 1917. After a period of unsuccessfully attempting to get education in Karakol, he moved to Almaty, where education opportunities did exist. Through Almaty authorities he entered the Kazakh Institute of Education (Kazinpros) in Tashkent.

Tynystanov was arrested, as part of Stalin's Great Purge, on 1 August 1938 and was subsequently executed on 6 November the same year.

Major linguistic work

Development of the Kyrgyz alphabet
According to historical archives, Kasym started to develop the first Kyrgyz alphabet while a student at Kazinpros. His first screenplay written in Kyrgyz, in his alphabet, was for a theatrical performance called Alymkul. It was performed several times during the summer of 1921 by students from Tashkent and Almaty. Unfortunately, the manuscript was lost after Kasym's arrest. Some of his poems and prose were published in Kazakh newspapers in Kyrgyz script since 1922. We therefore could assume that his alphabet was well known among Kyrgyz students living in Tashkent. T. Sydykbekov, a famous Kyrgyz writer, mentioned that Kasym's songs written in the new script were very popular among Kyrgyz youth.

Kasym worked on his alphabet between 1921 and 1926; he finalized the alphabet for the approval of the Government in 1924 and started to work on Kyrgyz orthography, which was approved in 1927 by the so-called Academic Center.

In 1924, Kasym Tynystanov, O. Aliev, B. Daniyarov and several others formed a Scientific Commission, which developed a Kyrgyz alphabet based on Arabic script. They created the first Communist Party newspaper in Kyrgyzstan Erkin Too. The day when the first issue of the newspaper was published is considered the birthday of written Kyrgyz language.

On 20 December 1924 at the opening ceremony of the Academic Center at the Department of the People's Education (DPE), Kasym Tynystanov was appointed a Deputy of Ishenally Arabaev, the Chair of the center.  The center was created to coordinate research activities of the DPE and supporting its educational activities. The center was, in particular, responsible for the development of research plans, coordination of research activities of DPE institutions, especially related to ethnography and lifestyles, participation in coordination of branch offices of research institutions of the USSR, creation of didactic materials and textbooks, etc.
By the end of 1924 came to a conclusion that a Cyrillic or a Latin based alphabet would have been be more adequate given language peculiarities. In addition such an alphabet would have been more convenient for the use of publishing equipment at the time. In spring of 1925 Kasym published several articles and convinced the government and the Communist Party in the need of a new script. Kasym made a speech at a Special Convention of Educators in which he analyzed the shortcomings of the existing Arabic based script and presented a new draft Latin based script. As a result of the discussion the Convention decided to include in the agenda of the coming Scientific and Educational Congress the issue of transferring from Arabic-based script to a new Latin based  one. The Congress of May 1925 accepted Kasym's proposal and issued a resolution indicating activities related to the process of transfer. The National Scientific Commission created a Society of Supporters of the New Alphabet, chaired by Kasym Tynystanov, which started to promote understanding and use of the new script. In 1926 member of the Turkologists Congress, which took place in Baku, widely supported the idea of adequacy of Latin script to peculiarities of Turkic languages.

After the Turkologists Congress Kasym became a permanent member of the Scientific Council of the USSR's Central Committee on Alphabet Adaptation, which had a mission on transferring the scripts of all Soviet Turkic languages to a Latin-based alphabet. In 1928 Kasym developed an alphabet for the Uyghur language and drafted a Dungan alphabet for the Dungans, living in the Soviet Union. In one and a half year after the Turkologists Congress a Committee for a New Kyrgyz Alphabet is created within DPE, with Kasym as its deputy chair.

In 1928 to meet the lack of periodicals in Kyrgyz, Kasym Tynystanov, Torokul Aytmatov and several others initiated the creation of a first scientific and educational journal Jangy Madaniyat Jolunda. The journal was financed through private contributions by representatives of Kyrgyz intelligentsia. The journal not only promoted the introduction of a new alphabet, but also aimed to improve qualifications of Kyrgyz teachers.

With the creation of the People's Commissariat of Education (The Ministry of Education) in spring of 1927, Kasym Tynystanov became its first chair (the Minister of Education) and remains in this position for the several years.

When the old Arabic based script was still in use, Kasym published the first textbook Ene Tilibiz (Our language) which was later published again with minor corrections in  new Latin based script. The comparison of the two editions brings one to a conclusion that the only principal difference between the alphabets is the appearance of letters.

In May 1934 on the Republican Orthography Convention presented New Orthography of Kyrgyz Language, which unlike the previous version also included the rules of correct use of Soviet and international term words. The New Orthography was published later that year.  Together with Kasym's Punctuation it was approved with minor corrections by the Kyrgyz Government.

Under Kasym's guidance for the People's Commissariat created ethnographic research sub-departments of the Scientific Council the first National Museum and the historic and geographic society, as well as the Committee of the New Alphabet.

Lexical and grammatical studies 
Kyrgyzstan officially joined the USSR as Karakyrgyz Autonomous Republic in 1924. 1927 The People's Commissariat and its Academic Center were the two principal institutions responsible for education and science.

In April 1925 the Academic Center temporarily ceased its activities. All functional responsibilities were transferred to the People's Commissariat. Being the Chair of the Commisariat Kasym Tynystanov continued to develop the concepts for coordination of the research and education in Kyrgyzstan. He also initiated various activities on studying Kyrgyz lifestyles and language peculiarities. Earlier, in 1924 after the approval of the new alphabet, Kasym created first Kyrgyz readers (reading books) for the first three grades of primary schools, the Grammar of the Kyrgyz Language, covering the primer, phonetics, morphology, and syntaxes.  His Morphology (1934) and Syntaxes (1936) were later published separately as school textbooks.

Kasym created a very successful terminology for the Kyrgyz grammar. Some 90 percent of the whole terminology, created by him is still in use. He created curricular as well as textbooks on language study for pedagogic institutes. Kasym laid out the theoretical basis for Kyrgyz grammar.

In November 1928 the first Kyrgyz Research Institute of Regional Studies was opened. This as well as most of Kasym's other initiatives, such as creation of a Literature Bureau, a Didactic Bureau Terminology Commission, and a national Museum, was a very practical effort aimed at formation of Kyrgyzstan into a nation state. These new institutions created fundamental methodologies for the Kyrgyz education system, created the basis for the development of science, etc. Kasym not only coordinated the activities of the Terminology Commission, but was actively involved in creating Kyrgyz terminology. He considered terminology as a separate trend in Kyrgyz language study, so he laid out its main principles and the methods for composition of so-called term systems. Based on these original findings he and his colleagues finalized the Theory for Terminology in Kyrgyz language in 1928.

Alone and as a co-author he created terminological dictionaries on seven subjects, among which were philosophy, social sciences, zoology.

A deep grammar research as well as detailed study of word inflection and formation patterns allowed Kasym to open "morphonology", a new trend in linguistics. Based on the findings related to his study of grammar patterns, he managed create a smart algorithm of word formation, which he expressed in his "Technical table". Using this tool, he prepared a lexical set of 100,000 Kyrgyz words in a short period of time. He selected 56,400 words out of them for further use in dictionaries.

Expert commission of the People's Commissariat of Education in 1932 came to a conclusion that the discovery is fundamental and would have had significant practical and theoretical use.

As a Chair of the People's Commissariat, Kasym not only organized numerous ethnographic research expeditions within Kyrgyzstan, but coordinated and took part in joint expeditions from other Soviet Republics. His many publications were based on the analysis of the findings of such expeditions. Based on such analysis he introduced such fundamental trends in Kyrgyz linguistics as Textual Criticism (Textology) and Dialectology. As a result of his dialectological research he created an orthographic system. His analysis of Moldo Niyaz's Datka Aiym became the first sample of a textual study. His contribution to the formation of Kyrgyz linguistics was tremendous.

Preservation of Kyrgyz oral folklore 
Before the Socialist Revolution, the Kyrgyz people, who did not have written language, had a very rich oral folklore. Such epics as Manas were extremely popular among the people. It was in 1923 that Tynystanov first went on an expedition to the eastern shore of Issyk Kul Lake to collect folklore. Later, when he became the Head of the Academic Center and the Chair of the People's Commissariat of Education, he continued to work on Manas. In 1926 he supported the publishing of a part of Semetei epic story (a part of a greater Manas epos), Tynybek's version, which Tynystanov personally valued very much. Since then his work concentrated on analyzing, preservation and publishing of Sayakbai Karalaev's and Sagynbai Orozbakov's versions of the Manas epic.

In the end of 1931, Manas found a reflection in a theatrical performance of in the National Theater. The screen play was written by Kasym Tynystanov. The epos was the main part of the so-called Academic Eves, consisted of three performances. Kasym wrote that Manas is the source of original Kyrgyz oral poetry and should be considered a part of the world cultural heritage.

In 1935, Kasym, by then Deputy Chair of editorial board of Manas epic, proposed to publish Manas in Russian and Kyrgyz. He also proposed to deepen the study of the epos, by paying more attention to its artistic, aesthetic, historic, and national value. He also presented a report at the USSR Conference on Manas Study, held in Frunze city in December 1935, where together with Mukhta Auezov and Evgeniy Polivanov he emphasized the importance preserving the epic.

Since 1936 together with Polivanov he translated and published selected parts of the epos in Russian. Manas always remained an important part of his life. Even in prison, he continued to read Manas to his prison mates.

Academic appointments 
In August 1932 Kasym was appointed acting director of the institute. He also focused on Dungan culture. His colleagues, especially, welcomed the creation of a Dungan Sector at the institute, which became the core organ on study and preservation of Dungan culture.

As for his academic titles, in 1934 Kasym Tynystanov became Senior Scientific Fellow and later an Active Member of Kyrgyz Research Institute of Culture. Since 1933, he taught History and Contemporary Kyrgyz Language at Kyrgyz Pedagogical Institute as Acting Professor. Because Kasym was expelled from the Communist Party in 1935, he seemed to have never been able to defend his Doctor's Dissertation, which he, nevertheless, successfully defended later in 1936.

Contributions in other fields 
As the Chair of the People's Commissariat of Education, Kasym contributed to the development of Kyrgyz soil science, botany, zoology, economics, agriculture, etc. Intensive work caused numerous health problems, and he voluntarily left the post of the Chair of the People's Commissariat of Education. In May 1931 after a long health treatment Kasym returned to his work and headed the Department of Language, Literature and Art at the National Council for Kyrgyz Language and Literature of the Kyrgyz Research Institute of Culture. Since then and until his arrest (he was arrested on ungrounded political accusations on 1 August 1937 and executed on 6 November 1938) he continued to work on Kyrgyz grammar. His role in organization of the Kyrgyz Research Institute of Culture was significant.

References

External links
CD-ROM "Kasym Tynystanov"
Kirghiz President Refused to Accept the Medal "For Outstanding Scientific Achievements in the 20th Century", which was instituted in his country

Kyrgyzstani scientists
Linguists from the Soviet Union
20th-century linguists
Soviet politicians
1901 births
1938 deaths
Kyrgyzstani poets
20th-century poets
Kyrgyzstani male writers
20th-century male writers
People from Issyk-Kul Region
Great Purge victims from Kyrgyzstan